Caenocrypticini is a tribe of darkling beetles in the subfamily Pimeliinae of the family Tenebrionidae. There are at least two genera in Caenocrypticini.

Genera
These genera belong to the tribe Caenocrypticini
 Caenocrypticoides Kaszab, 1969  (the Neotropics)
 Caenocrypticus Gebien, 1920  (tropical Africa)

References

Further reading

 
 

Tenebrionoidea